Champion is an upcoming eight-part musical British television series made for BBC One and BBC iPlayer. It is written by Candice Carty-Williams in her debut original television project.

Synopsis
The Champion siblings of South London, Bosco, and Vita, risk a musical rivalry that could drive their family apart.

Cast
 Déja J Bowens
 Malcolm Kamulete
 Ray BLK
  Nadine Marshall
 Ray Fearon 
 Jo Martin
 Kerim Hassan
 Adeyinka Akinrinade
 Tom Forbes
 Genesis Lynea
 Karl Collins
 Francis Lovehall
 Corey Weekes
 Rachel Adedeji

Production
Candice Carty-Williams was revealed to be writing a London based music drama for the BBC in May 2021. Carty-Williams is also executive producer on the project which is coming from the  production companies New Pictures and Balloon Entertainment, and produced by Joy Gharoro-Akpojotor. Executive producers also include Bryan Elsley, Dave Evans and Danielle Scott-Haughton for Balloon Entertainment, Charlie Pattinson, Willow Grylls and Imogen O’Sullivan for New Pictures, and Jo McClellan for the BBC.

Music
Ray BLK is making her acting debut on the series and is music executive on the project, along with Ghetts. Candice-Williams wrote music for the series and had the music before the story and used it to help form the characters with their personalities matching their musical styles.

Casting
In July 2025 the cast was announced to include Déja J Bowens, Malcolm Kamulete,  Nadine Marshall, Ray Fearon, Jo Martin, Kerim Hassan, Adeyinka Akinrinade, Tom Forbes, Genesis Lynea, Karl Collins, Francis Lovehall, Corey Weekes, Rachel Adedeji and Ray BLK.

Filming
Filming took place in Birmingham in July, through to September 2022. Filming locations included Selly Oak Corker.

Broadcast
The series is expected to broadcast in the UK and Ireland in 2023.

In July 2022 Netflix bought the rights to the series outside the UK and Ireland.

References

External links

2023 British television series debuts
2020s British drama television series
2020s British television miniseries
Black British television shows
Television shows filmed in England 
BBC television dramas
Television shows set in London
Television series about families